Arrested Development is an American hip hop group that formed in Atlanta in 1988. It was founded by Speech and Headliner as a positive, Afrocentric alternative to the gangsta rap popular in the late 1980s. Baba Oje and frontman Speech met at the University of Wisconsin–Milwaukee when they were both students. Baba Oje was 57 years old at the time.

History 
Arrested Development was formed in 1988 by rapper and producer Todd Thomas ("Speech") and turntablist Timothy Barnwell (known as Headliner). The group's debut album 3 Years, 5 Months and 2 Days in the Life Of... was the number-one album in the Village Voices 1992 Pazz and Jop Critic's Poll and in The Wires 1992 Critic's choice. The group won two Grammy Awards in 1993: for Best New Artist, making them the first hip hop artist to win this award, and for Best Rap Performance by a Duo or Group. They were also named Band of the Year by Rolling Stone. The debut album sold over 6 million copies worldwide. 

A few months later, the group was approached by film director Spike Lee to compose a song for his upcoming biopic based on the life of Malcolm X. The group then recorded "Revolution", which appeared on the soundtrack for the film as well as the second half of its closing credits when the film was released in 1992.

Their 1994 follow-up Zingalamaduni sold poorly, and they broke up shortly after in 1996. The group reunited in 2000, touring and releasing records via Speech's Vagabond Productions, but Aerle Taree did not return due to vocal problems. Today Aerle is a poet and converted from Buddhism to Christianity. DJ Headliner started his own business named Creative Royalty Group. On October 14, 2010, Baba Oje had a stroke.

In November 2003, the group sued the Fox network over the name of the TV show Arrested Development. The suit is referenced in the Arrested Development episodes "Public Relations", "Motherboy XXX", "Sword of Destiny", and "For British Eyes Only".

In June 2005, the group won the first round of the television series contest Hit Me, Baby, One More Time, performing "Tennessee" and covering Los Lonely Boys' "Heaven" and donated the $20,000 proceeds to UNICEF.
 
The group's follow-up to their 2004 Among The Trees was Since the Last Time, released internationally on September 18, 2006. Since the Last Time was released in the United States on October 30, 2007, on Vagabond Record & Tapes, Speech's boutique label.

In March 2007, they toured Australia as part of a triple-bill, along with Simple Minds and INXS. In 2008, Arrested Development teamed with The Black Eyed Peas and performed at The Concert for Peace in Jerusalem, Israel to promote peace among Palestinians and Israelis. Also in 2008, Arrested Development visited and sang with Debbie Peagler, an incarcerated survivor of domestic violence, and the inmate gospel choir that Peagler led at a California women's prison. Their visit was meant to support Peagler's legal battle for her release from prison and call attention to the plight of other victims of abuse and wrongful incarceration. The collaborative performance is included in Yoav Potash's documentary film Crime After Crime.

In 2010, the group released their ninth album Strong under Vagabond Records and Tapes, and licensed to the Japanese record label Cutting Edge, on December 9, 2009, and had a top 10 hit in Japan with the single "The World Is Changing". In an interview with Songfacts, Speech explained that the track "Greener" takes on the issue of climate change from the perspective of the African-American community.

On January 8, 2011, they with Emmylou Harris performed at the festival first night of the Sydney Festival in Sydney, Australia to 50,000 people. In August 2012, the group released its tenth album Standing at the Crossroads, recorded while touring internationally. The album, given away for free from the group's official website, took a lo-fi approach and was recorded entirely on a Mac laptop. The same month, they announced a new tour throughout the United States and Australia to celebrate their 20th anniversary.

On October 9, 2016, Arrested Development performed at the Delicious Festival in South Africa. A line up that included The Jacksons, Macy Gray, De La Soul, Elements of Life, Roy Ayers and local food celebrities Reuben Riffel, and Sarah Graham. The next day, members of Arrested Development drove to an orphanage in Soweto, then paid homage to Nelson Mandela at his home.

In January 2018, Arrested Development performed on the Trumpet Awards television show.

Baba Oje died of leukemia on October 26, 2018. His age was reported to be 86 or 87.

In October 2018, Speech released The Nigga Factory, a three-part docuseries exploring themes of racism and Afrocentrism. Later that year, they also released the album Craft & Optics.

In 2018, 16 Bars, a documentary that follows prison inmates as they undertake musical projects, was made.

On September 5, 2019, Arrested Development was given an award from Black Music Honors, which acknowledges artists that have made a significant contribution to African-American music.

Personnel

Current members 
 Speech – lead vocals, production (1988–1996, 2000–present)
 Jason "JJ Boogie" Reichert – guitar, mix engineering, production (2000–present)
 One Love – vocals (2001–present)
 Fareedah Aleem – vocals, dancing, choreography (2004–present)
 April Allen – vocals (2021–present)

Former members 

 Headliner – turntables (1988–1996)
 Baba Oje – spiritual elder (1990–1996, 2000–2018; his death)
 Montsho Eshe – dancing, choreography, vocals (1990–1996, 2000–2012)
 Rasa Don – drums, vocals (1990-1996, 2000–2006)
 Aerle Taree – vocals, stylist (1990–1996)
 Dionne Farris – vocals (1992)
 Ajile – vocals (1994–1995)
 Foley – bass (1994–1996)
 Kamaal Malak – bass (1994–1996)
 Kwesi Asuo – vocals (1994–1996)
 Nadirah Shakoor – vocals (1994–1996)
 Isaiah 'Za' Williams III – bass (1996, 2000–2018)
 Nicha Hilliard – vocals, dancing (1996, 2000–2008)
 Tasha Larae – vocals (2008–2021)

Discography

Albums

Compilations
 1998: Best of Arrested Development
 2001: Greatest Hits

Singles

See also
 List of number-one R&B hits (United States)
 List of number-one dance hits (United States)
 List of artists who reached number one on the U.S. dance chart

References

External links

 
 
 Arrested Development Japan
 Aerle Taree
 Radio Interview. Dec 2006 – 3SYN 90.7FM Melbourne, Australia
 Arrested Development video interview at allaboutjazz.com

Musical groups established in 1988
American dance music groups
Musical groups from Georgia (U.S. state)
Southern hip hop groups
Chrysalis Records artists
Avex Group artists
Grammy Award winners for rap music
Musical groups from Atlanta
Alternative hip hop groups